The Brussels Exhibition Centre, also known as Brussels Expo, is the most important event complex in Brussels, Belgium. Located on the Heysel/Heizel Plateau in Laeken (northern part of the City of Brussels), the twelve halls that comprise it are used for the largest national and international trade fairs, exhibitions and other events. With  of facility space, they constitute the largest exhibition space in the Benelux. They are also a remarkable witness to the evolution of construction techniques during the 20th century.

History
The construction of the Brussels Exhibition Centre began in 1931, when five halls were built for the Brussels International Exposition of 1935 to celebrate the centenary of Belgian Independence. The Palais 5/Paleis 5, informally known as the Centenary Palace, was the most ornamental of these first five halls and is still in use today.

After the World's Fair, expositions, trade fairs, congresses and other events took place in the halls. At the end of the 1940s, the Palais 4/Paleis 4 was added, and by 1957 also the Palais/Paleis 7, 8, 9, as well as the patio. In 1958, 58 additional buildings were constructed in preparation of the 1958 Brussels World's Fair (Expo '58), and the Atomium was also erected nearby. It would become one of the symbols of Brussels. The Palais 11/Paleis 11 was built in 1977, the Palais 12/Paleis 12 in 1989 and the Auditorium in 1993.

In recent years, some of the existing halls were renovated and modernised. The 32nd edition of the Eurovision Song Contest took place in the Centenary Palace in 1987. The Palais 12/Paleis 12 was also redesigned and reopened in its current form in 2013. It now hosts major events, such as big concerts, conferences, shows and major sporting events for a maximum capacity of 15,000 people.

Exhibition spaces
The venue has twelve main halls and several other exhibition areas, as well as twelve conference rooms. The main conference hall, Auditorium 2000, offers almost 2,000 seats, while the Palais 12/Paleis 12, a large indoor arena which hosts concerts and spectacles, has up to 15,000 seats. The parking areas have room for 12,000 cars, and are easily accessible from the Brussels Ring.

The Centenary Palace, designed by the architect Joseph Van Neck in Art Deco style, is one of the remaining buildings of the 1935 World's Fair. Its impressive dimensions—nearly —made it the largest of the exhibition's 182 pavilions. With its arches of unequalled size, it was also, at the time, the largest covered space in Belgium and had the world's largest reinforced concrete frame. During Expo '58, it served as the exhibition's entrance hall. On that occasion, its facade was hidden behind a nearly  temporary mask covered with 94 bronze stars and a copper dove designed by the architects-engineers Jacques Dupuis, Albert Bontridder and André Paduart. The Palace also hosted the 32nd Eurovision Song Contest in 1987. Currently, it is still being used for trade fairs, as well as concerts, usually for bigger acts and artists.

Accessibility
The complex is circumscribed by the /, the /, the /, the /, the /, the / and the /. This site is served by Heysel/Heizel metro station on line 6 of the Brussels Metro.

References

Notes

External links

City of Brussels
World's fair sites in Belgium
Event venues established in 1935
Buildings and structures in Brussels
1935 establishments in Belgium